Great Boiling Spring Park is a historical name for a former park that was on private property near Gerlach, Nevada, in a region known as the Black Rock Desert.  The spring is not currently accessible by the public and has not been so since the 1990s.   The park is on top of one of Nevada's most geothermally active regions, and contains dozens of hot springs and thermal pools. Great Boiling Spring  is fenced off to keep swimmers out. In the 1960s and 1970s, the park was a popular weekend destination for Nevada residents.

References 

Black Rock Desert
Former parks in the United States
Hot springs of Nevada